Carol Joffe is an American set decorator. She was nominated for two Academy Awards in the category Best Art Direction for the films Hannah and Her Sisters and Radio Days.

Biography
Joffe was first married to actor and artist Lawrence Holofcener, with whom she had two daughters, Suzanne Holofcener and director Nicole Holofcener. They divorced in 1961. She subsequently married film producer Charles H. Joffe.

Selected filmography
 Hannah and Her Sisters (1986)
 Radio Days (1987)

References

External links

Year of birth missing (living people)
Living people
American set decorators